Salta is the capital and largest city in the Argentine province of the same name. With a population of 618,375 according to the 2010 census, it is also the 7th most-populous city in Argentina. The city serves as the cultural and economic center of the Valle de Lerma Metropolitan Area (Spanish: Área Metropolitana del Valle de Lerma, AMVL), which is home to over 50.9% of the population of Salta Province and also includes the municipalities of La Caldera, Vaqueros, Campo Quijano, Rosario de Lerma, Cerrillos, La Merced and San Lorenzo. Salta is the seat of the Capital Department, the most populous department in the province.

History

Salta was founded on April 16, 1582, by the Spanish conquistador Hernando de Lerma, who intended the settlement to be an outpost between Lima, Peru, and Buenos Aires. The origin of the name Salta is a matter of conjecture, with several theories being advanced to explain it.

During the war of independence, the city became a commercial and military strategic point between Perú and the Argentine cities. Between 1816 and 1821, the city was led by local military leader General Martín Miguel de Güemes, who under the command of General José de San Martín, defended the city and surrounding area from Spanish forces coming from further north.

Salta emerged from the War of Independence politically in disarray and financially bankrupt, a condition that lingered throughout much of the 19th century. However, in the late 19th and early 20th centuries, the arrival of Italian, Spanish and Arab immigrants, particularly Syrians and Lebanese, revived trade and agriculture all over the area while further enhancing the city's multicultural flavor.

Climate
Salta has a subtropical highland climate (Cwb, according to the Köppen climate classification), and it is characterized by pleasant weather year-round. By winter, the dryness is extreme, with very few rain episodes. Snow is rare and frost is quite common, with temperatures reaching down to  during the coldest nights. Salta's winters are rather warm for its elevation and far inland position for a location being just outside the tropics.

During the rest of the year, blue skies dominate the region. Seemingly incessant summer thunderstorms greatly rejuvenate the surrounding mountainous landscape, making the various hills and mountainsides within the vicinity of the city green and lush once again. Salta receives 1863 hours of bright sunshine each year or about 5.1 hours per day.

Attractions

The city centre features a number of buildings dating back to the 18th and 19th and early 20th centuries. Clockwise around the Ninth of July Square are the neoclassical Cathedral Shrine, the French style Museum of Contemporary Art, the Cabildo (in former times, the city's town hall, nowadays a historical museum) and the neoclassical Museum of High Mountain Archaeology, which houses artifacts from the Inca civilization, including the mummies of three Inca children. The Plaza is almost completely surrounded by a gallery.

Within walking distance of the 9th July Square are the Saint Francis Church and the city's three pedestrian streets: Alberdi, Florida and "Caseros". The three blocks in Balcarce street closest to the train station are now the centre of night life in Salta, with restaurants, pubs and cafés on both sidewalks and concerts every night.

Rising in the east is San Bernardo Hill. Its summit, from which visitors can get a view of the city and the entire valley, can be reached by car, cable car or stairway.

Culture and arts

Salta is probably the most Spanish city in Argentina by physical appearance: so much so that tourists visiting from Spain often find a strong resemblance between Salta and Andalucian cities.  The local culture, however, is a blend of Spanish and gaucho (mestizo, criollo, both indigenous and non-indigenous) traditions, lending the city a distinctive identity, somewhat different from the more European-like metropolises to the south.

The city boasts three theatres, several museums (one of which exhibits the perfectly preserved bodies of c.500 year old Inca children sacrificed in the Andes to Inca gods), and a busy calendar of art exhibitions, shows, music festivals, and other cultural events.

One of the main activities in Salta is the April Culture Festival, which lasts the entire month and offers a wide variety of activities such as cultural performances, a handcraft exposition, and live orchestral performances.

Sports

Salta residents, like most Argentines, are very enthusiastic about football.  The most important local clubs are Juventud Antoniana, Gimnasia y Tiro de Salta, and Central Norte; many faithful fans follow each.  These three clubs currently play in the third national division.

Other locally popular sports include baseball (a game in which Salta players excel nationally), basketball, volleyball, rugby, and mountaineering.

The main sporting venue in Salta is the Padre Ernesto Martearena Stadium; the Gimnasia y Tiro and Juventud Antoniana stadiums also see many athletic matches.  The largest roofed facility in the city is the Ciudad de Salta Stadium, chiefly used for basketball, volleyball, and boxing.

Over the last forty years, Salta has played host to such high-profile international sporting events as the 1990 Basketball World Cup, the 1994 Camel Trophy, the 2002 Volleyball World Cup, and the 2009 Hockey Champions Challenge.  The Argentina national rugby union team, the "Pumas", have played in Salta against Italy (2005), England (2009), (2013), South Africa (2016.) and Scotland (2022) Top football clubs, including Boca Juniors, River Plate and Racing, have played friendly games in Salta in summer, off-season matches.

The city was used as a stage on the route of the 2014 and 2016 Dakar Rally.

Politics of Salta 
Salta is governed by a city council of 21 members. Following the elections of November 2013, the Workers' Party has 9 seats, the Justicialist Party has 6 seats, and there are 6 others.

Notable people
 Carlos Santiago Fayt, academic, judge
Carlos Ibarguren, academic, politician
César Isella, folk singer
Christian Rodrigo Zurita, footballer
Daniel Tinte, pianist, composer
David Kavlin, TV host
Dino Saluzzi, bandoneonist, composer
Francisco Gabino Arias, explorer and soldier
Jorge Horacio Brito, banker, businessman
José Alfredo Martínez de Hoz, former economy minister
José Evaristo Uriburu, president of Argentina
José Félix Uriburu, de facto president of Argentina
José Valdiviezo, footballer
Juan Figallo, rugby player
Juana Manuela Gorriti, feminist writer
Noemí Goytia, architect, professor
Martina Silva de Gurruchaga, independence fighter
Los Chalchaleros, folk music band
Los Nocheros, folk music band
Luciana Pedraza, actress
Luciano Leccese, footballer
Lucrecia Martel, film director
Luís Sillero, footballer
Mariano Boedo, statesman
Martín Miguel de Güemes, general
Renato Riggio, footballer
Robustiano Patrón Costas, infamous sugar tycoon
Victorino de la Plaza, politician, president of Argentina
Walter Busse, footballer
Wilfred Benítez, Puerto Rican boxer
Sara Solá de Castellanos, wrote the lyrics of the hymn of the city of Salta

Trivia
 The film Taras Bulba, starring Yul Brynner and Tony Curtis, was largely shot in the hills west of the city, near San Lorenzo.	 	
 Actor John Schneider (The Dukes of Hazzard and Smallville) was part of the cast of Cocaine Wars, another film shot in Salta.	
 Two Hollywood celebrities have married Salta natives: Matt Damon (to Luciana Bozán Barroso), and Robert Duvall (to Luciana Pedraza).

Transportation
The city's commercial airline needs are served by Aeropuerto Internacional Martín Miguel de Güemes, with service on three domestic airlines, including Aerolineas Argentinas, which is Argentina's largest domestic and international air carrier, and low cost airline Flybondi.

See also

2010 Salta earthquake
Argentina wine
Salta–Antofagasta railway
Torrontes

References

Notes

External links

 
 Municipality of Salta — Official website.
 Government of Salta Province — Official website.
 City history at the Chamber of Deputies website.
 Salta Province Tourism Office
 
 

 
Populated places in Salta Province
Capitals of Argentine provinces
Populated places established in 1582
Wine regions of Argentina
Cities in Argentina
Argentina
Salta Province